Héctor Echeverri Atehortúa (born 10 April 1938, died 1988), often misspelled as Héctor Echeverry, was a Colombian international footballer.

Club career
Echeverri played in 457 official matches for Independiente Medellín, more than any other player in the club's history.

International career
He competed for the Colombia national football team at the 1962 FIFA World Cup which was held in Chile. He played in their second group game on 3 June 1962 against the then Soviet Union.

References

External links

1938 births
Association football defenders
Colombian footballers
Colombia international footballers
1962 FIFA World Cup players
Independiente Medellín footballers
Categoría Primera A players
1988 deaths